Anneliese Meggl (born 3 December 1938) is a German former alpine skier who competed in the 1960 Winter Olympics.

References

1938 births
Living people
German female alpine skiers
Olympic alpine skiers of the United Team of Germany
Alpine skiers at the 1960 Winter Olympics
Place of birth missing (living people)